Ben Vehava (born 27 March 1992), also called Ben Wa'aba or Ben Vahaba, is an Israeli footballer who plays for Ironi Tiberias as a defender.

References

External links
 

1992 births
Living people
Israeli footballers
Israel international footballers
Association football defenders
Beitar Nes Tubruk F.C. players
Hapoel Ironi Kiryat Shmona F.C. players
Hapoel Be'er Sheva F.C. players
Bnei Yehuda Tel Aviv F.C. players
Hapoel Ra'anana A.F.C. players
Hapoel Haifa F.C. players
Ironi Tiberias F.C. players
Israeli Premier League players
Israeli people of Egyptian-Jewish descent
Footballers from Netanya
Israel under-21 international footballers